Colin Russell (born 21 January 1961) is an English former professional footballer who played in the Football League as a striker for Liverpool, Huddersfield Town, Stoke City, AFC Bournemouth, Doncaster Rovers, Scarborough and Wigan Athletic.

Career
Russell began his career as an apprentice with home-town club Liverpool, before signing professional terms at 18. Russell was part of Roy Evans' Central League champions side from 1979 to 1982 and frequently captained the side. He made his debut, and his only appearance for Liverpool's first team, on 2 May 1981 as the second-half substitute for Howard Gayle in a 1–0 defeat to Sunderland. In 1982 with the emergence of David Hodgson as Kenny Dalglish's understudy, Russell was transferred to Huddersfield Town where he enjoyed the most successful period of his career. He helped the Terriers gain promotion in 1982–83 scoring 16 league goals. Towards the end of 1983–84 Russell joined Stoke City on loan where he played 11 times scoring twice against former club Liverpool and Queens Park Rangers. The then went on to play for AFC Bournemouth, Doncaster Rovers and Scarborough followed before he ended his Football League career with Wigan Athletic in the 1988–89 season. After only a couple of months at Wigan, Russell moved into non-league football by joining former Liverpool teammate Alan Kennedy at Colne Dynamoes, at the time the only non-league side to offer lucrative contracts to their players. As the season got underway, financial hardship soon hit the club, and eventually the club folded. He went on play for Bangor City, Morecambe, Droylsden and Warrington Town.

Career statistics
Source:

A.  The "Other" column constitutes appearances and goals in the Football League Trophy.

References

External links
 

1961 births
Living people
Footballers from Liverpool
English footballers
Association football forwards
Liverpool F.C. players
Huddersfield Town A.F.C. players
Stoke City F.C. players
AFC Bournemouth players
Doncaster Rovers F.C. players
Scarborough F.C. players
Wigan Athletic F.C. players
Bangor City F.C. players
Morecambe F.C. players
Droylsden F.C. players
Warrington Town F.C. players
English Football League players
Colne Dynamoes F.C. players